The Eternal is the fifteenth and final studio album by American alternative rock band Sonic Youth, released on June 9, 2009 by Matador Records, their first and only on that label. It was their first studio album in three years (since Rather Ripped), making it the band's longest delay between studio albums.

The Eternal was the band's highest charting album of their career in the United States, peaking at No. 18 on the Billboard 200.

Background
After Rather Ripped (2006), the band's contract with Geffen Records had expired and the two parties decided to go their separate ways. At the same time, Jim O'Rourke was gradually replaced with ex-Pavement bassist Mark Ibold. Gordon suggested recruiting him for live shows after having played with him in Free Kitten. Moore found that Ibold "immediately locked in, and had really prepared himself to the point where he knew the songs better than we did".

Recording
When the band decided to record, it seemed natural to include Ibold. The process involved rehearsing the songs during the week in the basement of Moore and Gordon's house and subsequently recording them over the weekend. Shelley recalled, "It was like having a different project every week [and] it felt like we were doing a single every weekend. You kind of have to keep on your feet, the speed aspect to this album was very enjoyable". Eventually the band signed with Matador in 2008.

However, the band had begun writing much of the material before changing record labels. On the pop-rock aspects of the album, Moore noted, "I can sort of see a relationship between some of The Eternal and Dirty in terms of the dynamic". He argued that the band "definitely wanted to make songs as opposed to doing an avant-garde opus". On the choice of Matador, he explained that "we decided that they're a really strong song-supportive label". Ranaldo noted how they found inspiration in their earlier recordings on Daydream Nation, which "had an energy that we'd kind of forgotten about, and some of that energy and the experience of doing those songs impacted on the new record."

Content
The cover art was painted by John Fahey.

The album was dedicated to Ron Asheton of the Stooges.

Release
The Eternal was released on June 9, 2009 by record label Matador. The album was released digitally, on CD and as a double vinyl LP, in both a standard and a "Buy Early Get Now" (BEGN) edition.

In 2009, it was awarded a silver certification from the Independent Music Companies Association, which indicated sales of at least 30,000 copies throughout Europe.

Reception

The Eternal holds an approval rating of 79 out of 100 on review aggregator Metacritic, indicating "generally favorable reviews". An early review by Clash said "the album shows signs of life and heart-wrenching vitality that secures its makers’ position at the forefront of American rock music". In a "Critic's Choice" review for The New York Times, Ben Ratliff compared the album to two of their albums from the 1990s, Washing Machine and A Thousand Leaves; he pointed out that the album demonstrated Kim Gordon's continued rise as a singer, saying that she "sings all the best stuff" on The Eternal, particularly the album's last song, "Massage the History", a song he called the "record's sleeper stunner". The addition of Ibold in the studio was praised by Monday Field of Frank Booth Review, likening the album's basslines to "a 1AM, alcohol-soaked punch in the gut".

Many reviews were positive: musicOMH gave the album 5 of 5 stars and said that it "acts as a fitting and timeless aide-memoire of everything this mighty band has ever achieved." Los Angeles Times gave it 4 of 4 stars and said, "The music remains ageless and weird, fueled on chaos and clarity, but these are songs, not sound experiments for their own sake". Chicago Tribune gave the album 3.5 out of 4 stars and said: "Back on an independent label after nearly two decades with a major, the post-punk quartet returns to its '80s foundation with an album that breaks little new ground, but sounds thrilling all the same. [...] It casts aside some of the band's fondness for the warped digression and simply moves from one thrill ride to the next, rarely pausing for breath". The A.V. Club gave it a B+ and said that the songs "are more conventionally rock-oriented than any in Sonic Youth's career, yet the album doesn't really sound like a departure".

Other reviews were very average: The Austin Chronicle gave it a score of 3.5 stars out of 5 and said, "The three-guitar interplay, moderated by bassist Mark Ibold and Steve Shelley on drums, is confident if briefly indulgent ('Walkin Blue'), but Sonic Youth reigns in those tendencies for the most part, making The Eternal its most straightforward album yet". Yahoo! Music UK gave the album 6 of 10 stars and said it was "well-built, yes, but almost too well built, many parts sounding like they've been lifted directly from SY's vast back catalogue and slotted into place, like a jigsaw that needed completing, rather than the sprawling documents of noise and confusion this band's name is built upon". Tiny Mix Tapes gave it 3 of 5 stars and said the album was "accessible, listenable, and all the rest: another consistent album from the consistent rock band Sonic Youth".

Track listing

Personnel
Adapted from the album booklet.

Sonic Youth

 Kim Gordon – vocals, guitar, production, album back cover
 Mark Ibold – bass, production
 Thurston Moore – vocals, guitar, production
 Lee Ranaldo – vocals, guitar, production
 Steve Shelley – drums, percussion, production

Technical

 John Agnello – production, recording, mixing
 Greg Calbi – mastering
 Aaron Mullan – recording
 Justin Pizzoferrato – recording assistant
 James Frazee – mixing assistant
 Ted Young – ProTools engineer
 John Fahey – album front cover
 John Moloney – gatefold design
 Clarence Major – inner sleeve 1 design
 Gene Moore – inner sleeve 1 design
 Jutta Koether – inner sleeve 2 design
 Danny Fields – inner sleeve 2 design
 Cody Ranaldo – sleeve photography

Charts

References

Sonic Youth albums
Matador Records albums
2009 albums
Albums produced by John Agnello